A carcinologist is a scientist who studies crustaceans or is otherwise involved in carcinology (the science of crustaceans).

References

.
Carcinologists